The Opel Astra DTM was a specially-made and purpose-built touring car constructed by German car manufacturer Opel, for the DTM series, between 2000 and 2003.

References

External links

Opel Motorsport official website
DTM Official Website In German Language

Astra DTM
Deutsche Tourenwagen Masters cars